Hadleigh is a British television series that was produced by Yorkshire Television and originally ran from 1969 to 1976. Developed by Robert Barr, it was a sequel to the writer's earlier Gazette (1968) for the same company. The theme music was composed by Alan Moorhouse and, from series 3, Tony Hatch.

James Hadleigh, played by Gerald Harper, was "the perfect squire, paternalistically careful of his tenantry's welfare, beloved in the village, respected in the council." A "knight in a shining white Aston Martin V8 (actually a Monteverdi 375L), he sets about correcting local injustices". His wife, from a suburban middle-class background, was played by Hilary Dwyer. The series attracted around 17 million viewers at its peak.

Cast
 Gerald Harper as James Hadleigh 
 Ambrosine Phillpotts as Lady Helen Hadleigh
 Alastair Hunter as Maxwell (S1, S2)
 Peter Dennis as Sutton (S3, S4)
 Gillian Wray as Susan Jackson (S1)
 Jane Merrow as Anne Hepton (S2)
 Hilary Dwyer as Jennifer Caldwell (S3)
 Jenny Twigge as Joanna Roberts (S4)

Episodes

Gerald Harper appears as James Hadleigh in all 52 episodes.

Series 1: 1969

Series 2: 1971

Series 3: 1973

Series 4: 1976

References

External links
 

1960s British drama television series
1969 British television series debuts
1970s British drama television series
1976 British television series endings
English-language television shows
ITV television dramas
Television series by ITV Studios
Television series by Yorkshire Television
Television shows set in Yorkshire